Susan Northway Olasky (born 1954) is a journalist and the author of eight historical novels for children.

Youth and education

Born Susan Northway in Royal Oak, Michigan, United States, Olasky attended the University of Michigan where her liberal beliefs found a home on the Impeach Nixon campaign. After graduation in 1976, Olasky married Marvin Olasky, moved to California and became an evangelical. In 1983, Olasky received an M.A. in Urban Affairs from the University of Delaware in Newark, Delaware, where she was a volunteer counselor at a crisis pregnancy center.

Career and works

Upon moving to Texas in 1983, Olasky founded the Austin Crisis Pregnancy Center and co-authored a number of articles opposing abortion as well as a book, More Than Kindness: A Compassionate Approach to Crisis Childbearing. Olasky also wrote a regular column for the West Austin News during this time period. In the 1990s, Olasky chaired the board of Care Net, a national network of more than 1,050 crisis pregnancy centers.

Olasky began writing for World in 1995 and in 1997, achieved notoriety for several cover stories reporting on a controversial gender-neutral Bible translation.

In recent years, Olasky has served as World’s book editor and senior writer. She has authored the Annie Henry and Will Northaway series of historical novels, in each case using a Revolutionary War setting.

On September 22, 2006, an $800 Jeopardy clue – “Susan Olasky has written a kids’ series about the adventures of Annie, daughter of this fiery Virginia orator” – was a triple stumper.

Books
More Kindness: A Compassionate Approach to Crisis Childbearing (1990 with Marvin Olasky) 
Annie Henry and the Secret Mission (1995) 
Annie Henry and the Birth of Liberty (1995) 
Annie Henry and the Mysterious Stranger (1996) 
Annie Henry and the Redcoats (1996) 
Will Northaway and the Quest for Liberty (2004) 
Will Northaway and the Fight for Freedom (2004) 
Will Northaway and the Gathering Storm (2005) 
Will Northaway and the Price of Loyalty (2005)

References

1954 births
Living people
20th-century American non-fiction writers
20th-century American novelists
20th-century American women writers
20th-century evangelicals
21st-century American non-fiction writers
21st-century American novelists
21st-century American women writers
21st-century evangelicals
American children's writers
American magazine editors
American women academics
American women children's writers
American women journalists
American women novelists
American writers of young adult literature
Crisis pregnancy centers
Evangelical writers
Novelists from Michigan
Novelists from Virginia
Patrick Henry College faculty
People from Royal Oak, Michigan
University of Delaware alumni
University of Michigan alumni
Women magazine editors
Women writers of young adult literature